Washington and Sunderland West is a constituency represented in the House of Commons of the UK Parliament since its 2010 creation by Sharon Hodgson, a member of the Labour Party.

Constituency profile
The town of Washington has a well-preserved historic centre with a museum dedicated to the first US president, on its outskirts, the family home of George Washington. Residents have lower levels of wealth and education than UK averages.

Boundaries	

The City of Sunderland wards of Castle, Redhill, St Anne's, Washington Central, Washington East, Washington North, Washington South, Washington West.

Washington and Sunderland West was created for the 2010 general election when the Boundary Commission reduced the number of seats in Tyne and Wear from 13 to 12, with the constituencies in the City of Sunderland, in particular, being reorganised. The constituency was formed from parts of four abolished constituencies:

 Castle and Redhill wards from Sunderland North;
 St Anne's ward from Sunderland South;
 Washington Central, East and North from Houghton and Washington East; and 
 Washington South and West from Gateshead East and Washington West.

Political history 
All of the predecessor seats were held with majorities exceeding 5,000 votes and 5% of the vote before the 2010 election.  Electoral calculus, an academic website, gave a provisional ranking as the 28th-safest Labour seat in the United Kingdom, and the 11th-safest Labour seat in England based on the results of 2005.

Members of Parliament 

Selection of first MP
Following a ballot of members on 8 September 2007 Sharon Hodgson MP was selected as the Labour candidate, she represented 38% of the new seat which came from her previous seat of Gateshead East and Washington West which was abolished.

Elections

Elections in the 2010s 

 

For 2015, the British National Party announced Pauline Renwick as a candidate, but she failed to stand.

* Served as an MP for Gateshead East and Washington West in the 2005–2010 Parliament
2010 vote share changes and swing are based on notional results (a calculation of how the seat would have voted if it had existed at the previous election).

Notes

References

See also
 List of United Kingdom Parliament constituencies
 List of parliamentary constituencies in Tyne and Wear
 History of parliamentary constituencies and boundaries in Tyne and Wear
 Houghton and Sunderland South
 Sunderland Central

Politics of the City of Sunderland
Constituencies of the Parliament of the United Kingdom established in 2010
Parliamentary constituencies in Tyne and Wear